Meterostachys is a genus of plants in the family Crassulaceae, that contains a single accepted species, Meterostachys sikokiana, native to Japan and Korea. It is little known and is difficult to cultivate.

References

Crassulaceae
Monotypic Saxifragales genera
Crassulaceae genera